Darwin Jesús Pacheco Chinchilla (born July 24, 1976) is a Honduran football defender who currently plays for Deportivo Xinabajul in the Liga Nacional de Guatemala.

Club career
A big defender, Pacheco previously played for Marathón, Hispano and Deportes Savio in his native Honduras. He moved to Gilberto Yearwood's Guatemalan side Xinabajul in September 2009. In April 2011 he was relegated with Xinabajul.

International career
Pacheco made his debut for Honduras in a February 2005 UNCAF Nations Cup match against Nicaragua and has earned a total of 5 caps, scoring no goals, all at the 2005 UNCAF Nations Cup.

His final international was the match against Costa Rica.

References

External links
 

1976 births
Living people
People from Ocotepeque Department
Association football defenders
Honduran footballers
Honduras international footballers
C.D. Marathón players
Hispano players
Deportes Savio players
Liga Nacional de Fútbol Profesional de Honduras players
Honduran expatriate footballers
Honduran expatriate sportspeople in Guatemala
Expatriate footballers in Guatemala
2005 UNCAF Nations Cup players